The Attack on Convoy AN 14 was a naval engagement during the Second World War between a British naval force defending a convoy of merchant ships, sailing from Port Said and Alexandria to Piraeus in Greece and two Italian torpedo boats which intercepted them north of the island of Crete on 31 January 1941. The Italian vessels,  and  launched two torpedoes each. The torpedoes fired by Libra missed their target but one from Lupo hit the  British tanker Desmoulea which had to be towed to Suda Bay in Crete and beached; the ship was disabled for the rest of the war. One other merchant ship turned back; the other eight vessels reached Piraeus.

Background
When the Italo-Greek War commenced between Fascist Italy and Greece on 28 October 1940, the British began to send aircraft and stores through the Aegean Sea to support the Greek war effort. The Greek government provided the Allies with tugs, harbour vessels and a naval base for the British Mediterranean Fleet at Suda Bay in Crete. Greece and Britain had concluded a co-operation agreement in January 1940, which secured commercial relations and made the Greek merchant fleet available for the transport of war supplies to the Allies, before the Italo-Greek War began.

Prelude

Italian forces 
Since the beginning of the war with Britain in June 1940, Italian naval forces in the Dodecanese had limited capacity to supply garrisons. Most stores were carried by submarine and aircraft but the expedient was insufficient and the Italians began to use coastal ships. The ships ferried  of supplies to the Dodecanese, even after the closing of the Corinth Canal during the Italo-Greek War.

Convoy AN 14 
The bulk of the convoy sailed from Port Said on 28 January, with the corvette Gloxina. Levernbank and the large tanker Desmoulea, escorted by Calcutta and Peony, departed Alexandria on 29 January. The troop transport Ethiopia, carrying RAF personnel, left Alexandria some hours later, with the destroyer . The cruiser  and the Australian light cruiser  were to provide distant cover; Jaguar and Dainty swept the Kasos strait ahead of the convoy.

Action 

On 31 January 1941, the Italian torpedo boats departed Leros and while performing an anti-submarine search in the Kasos Strait, they spotted an Allied convoy, escorted by a cruiser and three destroyers. The two vessels separated,  to distract the escort, while  attacked with its  torpedoes. The Italians reported that  hit a large steamer with two torpedoes and then  launched another two at a cruiser without effect. The Italians were engaged by the escorts but managed to steam away.

In the British account, only one torpedo hit the tanker Desmoulea, which was loaded with a cargo of petrol and white oils. Admiral Andrew Cunningham recorded that the tanker had been detached to Suda Bay from the Alexandria section of the convoy and was torpedoed at 18:00 on 31 January. Dainty, the close escort, took the tanker in tow at 20:00, after it been abandoned by its crew. Perth assisted but the Cunningham ordered Perth to resume its escort duties. Desmoulea had been hit abreast the engine room and left sinking but the crew re-boarded the tanker when it became clear that it was still afloat. Desmoulea arrived in Suda Bay under tow at 08:00 on 1 February and beached with its cargo intact. Peony survived an attack by bombers  from Crete and the rest of the convoy reached Piraeus on 2 February 1941.

Aftermath

Analysis
Along with torpedo damage inflicted on the cargo ship Clan Cumming on 19 January by the Italian submarine , which was eventually destroyed by the escorts, this was the only Italian success against British convoys in the Aegean Sea. After the action, Allied shipping made passage into the Aegean through the more westerly Antikythera Strait.

Subsequent events

Desmoulea remained at Suda Bay for several weeks, down on the sandy bottom by the stern, with its after well deck awash; the cargo was transferred to the tanker Eocene. Desmoulea was towed by the armed boarding vessel HMS Chakla and escorted to Port Said by the anti-submarine trawlers  and HMT Amber. The ship arrived on 6 May and moored off the western beacon of Suez, for use as a temporary storage vessel. While awaiting repairs, Desmoulea was torpedoed again on 3 August 1941 by German bombers. Desmoulea was towed to Bombay in India, running aground twice during the passage. Desmoulea was converted into a stationary store ship and re-named Empire Thane. the ship remained in port at Cochin until 1947, from whence it was towed back to Britain. Desmoulea was rebuilt under its original name in 1949, before being laid up in 1955 and scrapped in 1961.

Casualties
The Third Engineering Officer, George William Donn, was killed in the action.

See also
 Attack on Convoy BN 7
 Operation Harpoon

Notes

Footnotes

References

Books

Journals

Websites

External links
  Convoy AN 14: Port Said to Piræus, 28 January – 2 February 1941. Arnold Hague Convoy Database (Shorter convoy series)

Mediterranean convoys of World War II
1941 in Greece
AN 14
Naval battles of World War II involving Australia
Naval battles of World War II involving Italy
Italian naval victories in the battle of the Mediterranean
Greco-Italian War
Naval battles involving Greece
History of the Dodecanese
January 1941 events